Harding and Miller Music Company is a historic commercial building located in downtown Evansville, Indiana. It was built in 1891, and is a -story, style brick building with limestone detailing.  It features a decorative parapet.

It was listed on the National Register of Historic Places in 1982.

References

Commercial buildings on the National Register of Historic Places in Indiana
Commercial buildings completed in 1891
Buildings and structures in Evansville, Indiana
National Register of Historic Places in Evansville, Indiana